Born to Run is the third studio album by American singer-songwriter Bruce Springsteen, released on August 25, 1975, by Columbia Records. As his effort to break into the mainstream, the album was a commercial success, peaking at number three on the Billboard 200 and eventually selling seven million copies in the United States. Two singles were released from the album: "Born to Run" and "Tenth Avenue Freeze-Out"; the first helped Springsteen to reach mainstream popularity. The tracks "Thunder Road", "She's the One", and "Jungleland" became staples of album-oriented rock radio and Springsteen concert high points.

Born to Run garnered widespread acclaim on release. Many critics have called it one of the greatest rock albums of all time. On November 14, 2005, a 30th Anniversary remaster of the album was released as a box set including two DVDs: a production diary film and a concert movie.

The album was remastered again in 2014 by veteran mastering engineer Bob Ludwig, who has worked on much of Springsteen's audio output since 1982, for release as part of The Album Collection Vol. 1 1973–1984, a boxed set composed of remastered editions of his first seven albums. It was later released in remastered form as a single disc as well.

Recording
Springsteen began work on the album in May 1974. Having been given an enormous budget in a last-ditch effort at a commercially viable record, Springsteen became bogged down in the recording process while striving for a wall of sound production. Fed by the release of an early mix of "Born to Run" to nearly a dozen radio stations, anticipation built toward the album's release.

Springsteen has noted a progression in his songwriting compared to his previous work.  Unlike Greetings from Asbury Park, N.J. and The Wild, the Innocent & the E Street Shuffle, Born to Run includes few specific references to places in New Jersey, in an attempt to make the songs more identifiable to a wider audience. Springsteen has also referred to a maturation in his lyrics, calling Born to Run "the album where I left behind my adolescent definitions of love and freedom—it was the dividing line." In addition, Springsteen spent more time in the studio refining songs than he had on the previous two albums.

All in all, the album took more than 14 months to record, with six months alone spent on the song "Born to Run" itself. During this time Springsteen battled with anger and frustration over the album, saying he heard "sounds in [his] head" that he could not explain to the others in the studio.

During the process, Springsteen brought in Jon Landau to help with production, made contractually official on April 13, 1975. Five days later, sessions resumed at The Record Plant, New York City, with Jimmy Iovine as engineer. This was the beginning of the breakup of Springsteen's relationship with producer and manager Mike Appel, after which Landau assumed both roles. The album was Springsteen's first to feature pianist Roy Bittan and drummer Max Weinberg (although David Sancious and Ernest "Boom" Carter played the piano and drums, respectively, on the title track, which was finished August 1974, before they left the band).

The album is noted for its use of introductions to set the tone of each song (all of the record was composed on piano, not guitar), and for the Phil Spector-like "Wall of Sound" arrangements and production. Springsteen has said that he wanted Born to Run to sound like "Roy Orbison singing Bob Dylan, produced by Spector." Most of the tracks were first recorded with a core rhythm section band comprising Springsteen, Weinberg, Bittan, and bassist Garry Tallent, with other members' contributions then added on.

In terms of the original LP's sequencing, Springsteen eventually adopted a "four corners" approach, as the songs beginning each side ("Thunder Road", "Born to Run") were uplifting odes to escape, while the songs ending each side ("Backstreets", "Jungleland") were sad epics of loss, betrayal, and defeat. (Originally, he had planned to begin and end the album with alternative versions of "Thunder Road".)

A few original pressings have "Meeting Across the River" billed as "The Heist", and the original album cover has the title handwritten with a broad-nib pen. These copies, known as the "script cover," are very rare and considered to be the "holy grail" for Springsteen collectors.

Marketing and sales
The album's release was accompanied by a $250,000 promotional campaign by Columbia, directed at both consumers and the music industry, making good use of Landau's "I saw rock and roll future and its name is Bruce Springsteen" quote. With much publicity, Born to Run vaulted into the top 10 in its second week on the charts and soon went Gold. Time and Newsweek magazines put Springsteen on the cover in the same week (October 27, 1975) – in Time, Jay Cocks praised Springsteen, while the Newsweek article took a cynical look at the "next Dylan" hype that haunted Springsteen until his breakthrough. The question of hype became a story in itself, as critics began wondering if Springsteen was for real or the product of record company promotion.

Upset with Columbia's promotion department, Springsteen said the decision to label him as the "future of rock was a very big mistake and I would like to strangle the guy who thought that up." When Springsteen arrived for his first UK concert at the Hammersmith Odeon, he personally tore down the "Finally the world is ready for Bruce Springsteen" posters in the lobby and ordered that the buttons with "I have seen the future of rock 'n' roll at the Hammersmith Odeon" printed on them not be given out. When the hype died down, sales tapered off and the album was off the chart after 29 weeks. However, the album had established a solid national fan base for Springsteen, which he would build on with each subsequent release.

The album first charted at number 84 on the Billboard album chart in the week of September 13, 1975. The following week, it made an impressive increase, entering the top 10 at No. 8, then spent two weeks at No. 4, and finally, during the weeks of October 11 and 18, Born to Run reached its peak position of No. 3. Born to Run continued to be a strong catalog seller through the years, re-entering the Billboard chart in late 1980 after The River was released, and again after the blockbuster success of Born in the U.S.A., spending most of 1985 on the chart. It was certified triple-platinum by the Recording Industry Association of America in 1986, the first year in which pre-1976 releases were eligible for platinum and multi-platinum awards.
Columbia first issued the album on CD in Japan in 1982, and in the US in 1984. It has since been reissued several times, including on vinyl. Several limited edition versions on 12-inch vinyl have been released, including a CBS half-speed master version in 1980 as part of its Mastersound audiophile series, a 1999 QUIEX vinyl LP edition, and a 180g vinyl LP edition, from the same masters used for the 2014 boxed set, was issued in May 2015 in conjunction with Record Store Day.

Critical reception 

Born to Run received highly positive reviews from critics. In a rave review for Rolling Stone magazine, Greil Marcus wrote that Springsteen enhances romanticized American themes with his majestic sound, ideal style of rock and roll, evocative lyrics, and an impassioned delivery that defines what is a "magnificent" album: "It is the drama that counts; the stories Springsteen is telling are nothing new, though no one has ever told them better or made them matter more." John Rockwell, writing in The New York Times, said that the "solidly rock 'n' roll" album is more diverse than Springsteen's previous albums, while his detailed lyrics retain a universal quality that transcends the sources and myths he drew upon. Robert Christgau of The Village Voice felt that he condenses a significant amount of American myth into songs, mostly centered on taking a lover for a joyride, and often succeeds in spite of his tendency for histrionics and "pseudotragic beautiful loser fatalism": "Springsteen may well turn out to be one of those rare self-conscious primitives who get away with it." Langdon Winner was less enthusiastic in his review for The Real Paper and argued that, because Springsteen consciously adheres to traditions and standards extolled in rock criticism, Born to Run is "the complete monument to rock and roll orthodoxy".

Born to Run was voted the third best album of 1975 in the Pazz & Jop, an annual critics poll run by The Village Voice. Christgau, the poll's creator, ranked it 12th on his own year-end list. He later wrote that its major flaw was its pompous declaration of greatness, typified by elements such as the "wall-of-sound, white-soul-at-the-opera-house" aesthetic and an "unresolved quest narrative". Nonetheless, he maintained the record was important for how "its class-conscious songcraft provided a relief from the emptier pretensions of late-hippie arena-rock." On the other hand, AllMusic's William Ruhlmann contends that although "some thought it took itself too seriously, many found that exalting."

According to Acclaimed Music, it is the 16th most celebrated album in popular music history. In 1987, it was ranked No. 8 by Rolling Stone in its "100 Best Albums of the Last Twenty Years" and in 2003, the magazine ranked it 18th on its list of The 500 Greatest Albums of All Time, maintaining the rating in a 2012 revision and dropping a few slots to number 21 in the 2020 reboot of the list. In 2001, the TV network VH1 named it the 27th-greatest album of all time, and in 2003, it was ranked as the most popular album in the first Zagat Survey Music Guide. The album was also included in the book 1001 Albums You Must Hear Before You Die. It was voted number 20 in the third edition of Colin Larkin's All Time Top 1000 Albums (2000).  Born to Run was also listed in the Library of Congress' National Recording Registry of historic recordings. In December 2005, U.S. Representative Frank Pallone (who represents Asbury Park) and 21 co-sponsors sponsored H.Res. 628, "Congratulating Bruce Springsteen of New Jersey on the 30th anniversary of his masterpiece record album 'Born to Run', and commending him on a career that has touched the lives of millions of Americans."  In general, resolutions honoring native sons are passed with a simple voice vote. This bill, however, was referred to the House Committee on Education and the Workforce and died there.

Live performances
Songs from Born to Run were performed live as early as mid-1974, and by 1975, all had made their way into Springsteen's shows and (with the rare exception of "Meeting Across the River") continued to be a regular staple of his concerts on subsequent tours through 2018. Springsteen and the E Street Band performed Born to Run in its entirety and for the first time at a benefit performance at the Count Basie Theatre in Red Bank, New Jersey, on May 7, 2008. It was again performed during their September 20, 2009, show at the United Center in Chicago, Illinois, as well as several other shows on the fall 2009 leg of the Working on a Dream Tour. During the 2013 spring-summer run of his Wrecking Ball Tour, Springsteen again began to perform the album in its entirety although a few times its performance was not included in the actual set lists and it was performed as either a surprise or request.

On June 20, 2013, the full album was performed at the Ricoh Arena, the home of Coventry City F.C. in Coventry, England, and dedicated to the memory of actor James Gandolfini, who died of a heart attack the previous day. On March 2, 2014, the full album was performed at Mt Smart Arena in Auckland, New Zealand for 40,000 fans.

Artwork

The cover art of Born to Run is one of rock music's most recognizable images. It was taken by Eric Meola, who shot 900 frames in his three-hour session. These photos have been compiled in Born to Run: The Unseen Photos.

The photo shows Springsteen holding a Fender Telecaster with an Esquire neck, while leaning against saxophonist Clarence Clemons. That image became famous as the cover art. "Other things happened," says Meola, "but when we saw the contact sheets, that one just sort of popped. During the Born to Run tours, Springsteen and Clemons would occasionally duplicate the pose onstage for several seconds after a song while the stage lights were dim. As soon as the audience recognized and responded to what they were doing, they immediately broke the pose.

The Springsteen and Clemons cover pose has been imitated often, from Cheap Trick on the album Next Position Please, to Tom and Ray Magliozzi on the cover of the Car Talk compilation Born Not to Run: More Disrespectful Car Songs, to Kevin & Kell on a Sunday strip entitled "Born to Migrate" featuring Kevin Dewclaw as Springsteen with a carrot and Kell Dewclaw as Clemons with a pile of bones, to Bert and the Cookie Monster on the cover of the Sesame Street album Born to Add. The Spanish band, Los Secretos, also imitated the pose on the cover of the album, Algo Prestado in 2015.

30th Anniversary Edition and Album Collection releases 

On November 14, 2005, Columbia Records released Born to Run 30th Anniversary Edition in box set form. The package included a remastered CD version of the original album. "Born to Run is the one I've remastered several times; most recently for the box set..." recalled Bob Ludwig. "That's the one that Bruce told me sounded closest to the way he'd imagined it in his head, which is the ultimate compliment."

The CD is all black (including playback side), with the label side replicating the original vinyl disc, having four bands (the original LP had four tracks per side), and including a modified red Columbia label listing all eight tracks. The DVD included Wings for Wheels, a lengthy documentary on the making of the album, which later won the 2007 Grammy Award for Best Long Form Music Video, with bonus film of three songs recorded live on May 1, 1973, at the Ahmanson Theatre in Los Angeles. The DVD also included Bruce Springsteen & The E Street Band Hammersmith Odeon, London '75, a full-length concert film recorded on November 18, 1975, at the Hammersmith Odeon in London during the brief European portion of their Born to Run tours. This live recording was subsequently released as the CD Hammersmith Odeon London '75. Packages from retailer Best Buy also included a CD single replica of the original "Born to Run" 45 single.

The box set debuted on the Billboard 200 album chart on December 3, 2005, at number 18 with sales of 53,206 copies.

In November 2014, Columbia Records/Legacy Recordings released The Album Collection Vol. 1 1973–1984, a boxed set composed of remastered editions of Springsteen's first seven albums recorded and released for Columbia Records between 1973 and 1984. Born to Run was one of those seven titles that were released individually on CD, with artwork true to the original LP packaging. Columbia also released it in single CD form in June 2015.

Track listing

Original release

Cassette version
The cassette version has the song order rearranged to save tape space, which was a common practice amongst the record companies.  The track listing for the cassette is as follows:

Unreleased outtakes
There are currently seven known outtakes from the album:

"Linda Let Me Be The One"
"Lonely Night in the Park"
"A Love So Fine"
"A Night Like This"
"Janey Needs a Shooter"
"Lovers in The Cold"
"So Young and in Love"

Two of those seven, "Linda Let Me Be the One" and "So Young and in Love" were released on the Tracks box set. Rough mixes of the unreleased songs "Lovers In The Cold" (Walking in the Street) and "Lonely Night in the Park" surfaced in 2005, when they made their debut on E Street Radio. "Lovers In The Cold'" originally contained the closing musical figure that became the anthemic ending to "Thunder Road". The album sequence as of July 2, 1975, included "Linda Let Me Be the One" and "Lonely Night in the Park", and deleted "Born to Run". However, Mike Appel had a personal talk with Springsteen, and on July 7, 1975, an amended final sequence was issued with the released tracklist. "Janey Needs a Shooter" would later be re-worked by Springsteen and Warren Zevon into the track "Jeannie Needs a Shooter," included on Zevon's 1980 album Bad Luck Streak in Dancing School. On October 23, 2020, a 2019 recording of the original "Janey Needs a Shooter" was released on the album Letter to You.

Personnel
Adapted from the liner notes:
 Bruce Springsteen – lead vocals, lead and rhythm guitars (tracks 1–6, 8), harmonica (track 1), horn arrangement (track 2)
The E Street Band
 Roy Bittan – piano (tracks 2–4, 6–8), glockenspiel (tracks 1, 3), harpsichord (tracks 3, 6), organ (tracks 4, 6), Fender Rhodes (track 1), background vocals (track 1)
 Clarence Clemons – saxophones (tracks 1–3, 5, 6, 8)
Garry Tallent – bass guitar (tracks 1–6, 8)
Max Weinberg – drums (tracks 1–4, 6, 8)
Ernest Carter – drums (track 5)
 Danny Federici – organ (track 5)
 David Sancious – keyboards (track 5)
 Steven Van Zandt – background vocals (track 1), horn arrangement (track 2)
Mike Appel – background vocals (track 1)
Randy Brecker – trumpet (tracks 2, 7), flugel horn (track 2)
Michael Brecker – tenor saxophone (track 2)
David Sanborn – baritone saxophone (track 2)
Wayne Andre – trombone (track 2)
Richard Davis – bass (track 7)
 Suki Lahav – violin (track 8)
Charles Calello – string arrangements and conductor (track 8)

Technical personnel:
Mike Appel, Bruce Springsteen – production
Jon Landau – production (tracks 1–4, 6–8)
 Jimmy Iovine – engineering and mixing
Thom Panunzio, Corky Stasiak, Dave Thoener, Ricke Delena, Angie Arcuri, Andy Abrams – engineering assistants
Louis Lahav – engineering (track 5)
Greg Calbi – mastering
Paul Prestopino – maintenance
John Berg, Andy Engel – album design
 Eric Meola – photography

Charts

Certifications and sales

See also
Born to Run

References

External links
 
 Album lyrics and audio samples
 Collection of album reviews
 Born To Run Photographs

Bruce Springsteen albums
1975 albums
Albums arranged by Charles Calello
Albums produced by Jon Landau
Albums produced by Mike Appel
Albums recorded at Record Plant (New York City)
Columbia Records albums
United States National Recording Registry albums
United States National Recording Registry recordings